Carlos Alberto Zamora Castellanos (born 14 January 1996) is a Mexican professional footballer who plays as a centre-back for Liga de Expansión MX club Tepatitlán, on loan from Guadalajara.

References

1996 births
Living people
Mexican footballers
Association football defenders
Coras de Nayarit F.C. footballers
C.D. Guadalajara footballers
Club Atlético Zacatepec players
Tampico Madero F.C. footballers
Liga MX players
Ascenso MX players
Liga Premier de México players
Tercera División de México players
Footballers from Guadalajara, Jalisco